Arundel and District Hospital is a health facility in Chichester Road, Arundel, West Sussex, England. It is managed by the Sussex Community NHS Foundation Trust.

History
The facility has its origins in the Arundel and District Emergency Hospital which opened in King Street in 1906. The site for the present facility in Chichester Road was a gift from the Duke of Norfolk. The building, which was designed by John Saxon Snell, opened as the Arundel and District Hospital in 1931. It joined the National Health Service in 1948 and was extended in 1964.

References

External links
Official site

Hospital buildings completed in 1931
1906 establishments in England
Hospitals established in 1906
Hospitals in West Sussex
NHS hospitals in England
Arundel